Devender Kumar Nim is an Indian politician. He belongs to the Bharatiya Janata Party. He is a member of 18th Uttar Pradesh Assembly and was also  Seventeenth Legislative Assembly of Uttar Pradesh member representing the Rampur Maniharan constituency. Nim is 47 years old (2017).

Political career
Nim has been a member of the 18th Uttar Pradesh Assembly and also the 17th Legislative Assembly of Uttar Pradesh. He got 89,109 votes in 18th Uttar Pradesh Assembly and defeated BSP candidates by a margin of 20,593 votes. Since 2017, he has represented the Rampur Maniharan and is a member of the Bhartiya Janata Party. In 2017 elections he defeated Bahujan Samaj Party candidate Ravinder Kumar Molhu by a margin of 595 votes.

Posts held

References 

Bharatiya Janata Party politicians from Uttar Pradesh
People from Saharanpur
Living people
Uttar Pradesh MLAs 2017–2022
Year of birth missing (living people)
Uttar Pradesh MLAs 2022–2027